Mazeh Kaz (also Romanized as Māzeh Kaz; also known as Māzeh Gar, Māzeh Gaz, and Māzgeh) is a village in Sadat Mahmudi Rural District, Pataveh District, Dana County, Kohgiluyeh and Boyer-Ahmad Province, Iran. At the 2006 census, its population was 237, in 39 families.

References 

Populated places in Dana County